Walter Diggelmann (Zürich, 11 August 1915 – Guntalingen, 5 March 1999) was a Swiss professional road bicycle racer. Diggelmann won one stage in the 1952 Tour de France.

Major results

1938
Giro del Mendrisiotto
1940
Bern - Geneva
1941
Züri-Metzgete
1943
Tour des 3 lacs
1948
Six days of Chicago (with Hugo Koblet)
1949
Six days of New York (with Hugo Koblet)
1952
Tour de France:
Winner stage 9

External links 

Official Tour de France results for Walter Diggelmann

Swiss male cyclists
1915 births
1999 deaths
Swiss Tour de France stage winners
Cyclists from Zürich
Tour de Suisse stage winners
20th-century Swiss people